The England–Scotland football rivalry, between the England and Scotland national football teams, is the oldest international fixture in the world, first played in 1872 at Hamilton Crescent, Glasgow. Scottish nationalism has been a factor in the Scots' desire to defeat England above all other rivals, with Scottish sports journalists traditionally referring to the English as the "Auld Enemy".

The rivalry has diminished somewhat since the late 1970s, particularly since annual fixtures stopped in 1989. For England, games against Germany and Argentina are now considered to be more important than the historic rivalry with Scotland.

BBC Online commented that the games "have represented all that is good and all that is bad about football since the fixture began," while The Guardian newspaper once reported that "for millions across both sides of the border the encounter represents a chance for the ultimate victory over the enemy." As of 2021, the teams have played 115 matches; England have won 48, Scotland 41, and there have been 26 draws.

Background and early years

The rules of association football had been formalised and set down by The Football Association in England in 1863. By 1870 C. W. Alcock, Secretary of The Football Association, issued public challenges in various Scottish newspapers, including The Glasgow Herald, to Scottish players to play an international match against England. One of the few public responses that Alcock received from Scotland stated that "devotees of the 'association' rules will find no foeman worthy of their steel in Scotland". Alcock ardently defended that the right to play in these matches "was open to every Scotchman whether his lines were cast North or South of the Tweed". The first match was described in the Glasgow Herald as "the great international football match" and there was acceptance by the same newspaper in 1871 that "both captains had been successful in the composition of elevens capable of efficiently representing their respective causes".

Although the five matches played between 5 March 1870 and 24 February 1872 are not currently recognised by FIFA as official, they were organised under the auspices of the FA and were described as "international" by The Scotsman newspaper. In 1870, Alcock had even suggested that the next international match should be held near the England-Scotland border as an easily accessible venue for both teams, but this did not receive a response. Requests for Scotland-based players to partake were issued for each of these five matches, for example in November 1870:

The matches are notable not just for being the first international matches, but also for illustrating emerging team playing tactics. For example, in the November 1870 match onlookers were treated to a match with "many scientific points" and in 1871 players (including Alcock) are noted to have been "acting in concert", leading to a goal"

England v Scotland 1870–72: scores and results list Scotland's goal tally first.

In 1872 a challenge match was agreed with the Glasgow team Queen's Park, who would represent Scotland. The FA's minutes of 3 October 1872 note that:

According to The Scotsman newspaper of 2 December 1872, there were only about ten football clubs in Scotland. These early international matches helped to increase the popularity of association football in Scotland. The first official match was held on 30 November 1872, on Scotland's national saint's day, St. Andrew's Day, and it took place at Hamilton Crescent in Partick, home of the West of Scotland Cricket Club. The Scotland team was made up entirely of players from Queen's Park, the most successful Scottish club of the period. The game ended a 0–0 draw, watched by a crowd of 4000 who had paid a shilling each for admission.

The first goal between the two sides was scored by England's William Kenyon-Slaney in the next game at The Oval, the first official match between the two in England, which the English won 4–2 on 8 March 1873. Following this, the game became an annual event, being held in England or Scotland in alternate years. Scotland took their first win in the fixture in the 1874 game, again played at Hamilton Crescent, where they defeated England 2–1. Later in the 1870s Scotland won the fixture three times in a row, including a 7–2 victory in the 1878 game.

Famous matches in the annual series

From the first match in late 1872, England and Scotland played each other in the spring of every year (except during World War I and World War II) until 1989. From 1884 until 1984, the match was the highlight of the annual British Home Championship played between England, Scotland, Wales and Northern Ireland. Due to the capacity of Hampden Park in the period, the fixture drew some of the largest ever football crowds, including the enduring European record attendance of 149,415 in 1937 (even though there was little to play for in that match: Wales had already won the series). After the British Home Championship ended in 1984, the annual England v Scotland fixture continued in the form of the Rous Cup until 1989.

The only exception to this pattern of annual fixtures in the spring was in 1973, when there were two games. The first game that year was a friendly match that marked the centenary of the Scottish Football Association. There were also two fixtures staged in 1902, but this was because the first game had to be abandoned due to the first Ibrox disaster. The British Home Championship also acted as qualifiers for three major tournaments – the 1950 World Cup, the 1954 World Cup and the 1968 European Championship.

1928

The 1928 Scotland team which defeated England 5–1 at Wembley was nicknamed the Wembley Wizards. The match had an unusual background; England and Scotland were the two traditionally dominant countries in the British Home Championship, yet neither side had managed to beat either Ireland or Wales in their first two games of that year's Championship.

Match summary

1961
The game played in 1961 saw Scotland suffer their heaviest defeat in the fixture. The performance of Scotland goalkeeper Frank Haffey contributed towards the English stereotype of bad Scottish goalkeepers. England players Jimmy Armfield and Johnny Haynes insisted that the result was more due to the quality of their forward play, and that Haffey could not have done much else to prevent most of the goals.

Match summary

1967
England had won the 1966 FIFA World Cup at Wembley less than a year before the 1967 game, and were undefeated in 19 games. Despite fielding four of the Celtic side that went on to win the European Cup a month later and stars such as Denis Law, Jim Baxter and Billy Bremner, Scotland were massive underdogs going into the match. Scotland took an early lead through a goal by Law, and Bobby Lennox put Scotland 2–0 up with just 12 minutes remaining. England were somewhat hampered by the fact that Jack Charlton suffered an injury early in the game. England manager Alf Ramsey was unable to substitute Charlton and therefore decided to use him in the unfamiliar role of centre forward. Ironically, Charlton scored England's first goal. Scotland soon reestablished a two-goal lead, however, with Jim McCalliog making the score 3–1. Geoff Hurst scored a late goal to make the final score 3–2 to Scotland.

Baxter played "keepie uppie" as Scotland toyed with their opponents late in the game. The Scots playfully claimed afterwards that the victory made them unofficial world champions. Ultimately, however, it was England who qualified for the 1968 European Championship because of results in the other matches.

Match summary

1977

At the end of the 1977 match, the Scottish fans invaded the pitch, ripping up large sections of it and tearing down the goalposts.
The match itself was a triumph for the new Scotland manager Ally MacLeod and contributed to the sense of optimism that built towards Scotland's participation in the 1978 FIFA World Cup. Gordon McQueen opened the scoring late in the first half with a powerful header from a crossed free-kick from the left-hand side. Kenny Dalglish doubled Scotland's advantage with a scrambled effort, before England scored a late consolation goal from a penalty kick taken by Mick Channon. The defeat hastened the end of Don Revie's tenure as England manager.

Match summary

Matches since the end of the annual series

1996 European Championship
In December 1995, despite media rumours that UEFA would deliberately keep the two apart in the draw, England and Scotland were both drawn in the same group for the forthcoming European Championship, to be hosted by England in the summer of 1996. This draw excited much comment and anticipation in the build-up to the championship, especially as it would be the first meeting between the two sides for seven years, and tickets for the game sold out within two days of the draw being made. The match assumed even greater significance for both teams when both England and Scotland drew their opening fixtures, against Switzerland and the Netherlands respectively, meaning both were even more in need of a win to further their chances of progressing in the tournament.

The match was played at Wembley Stadium on Saturday 15 June 1996. Before the game, Scotland's national anthem, Flower of Scotland, was completely drowned out by booing from English spectators. The first half was closely fought, ending 0–0, although Scotland had the better of the chances. The introduction of Jamie Redknapp into the England team as a substitute for the second half helped to turn the match in England's favour, and they took the lead through a headed goal by Alan Shearer. Scotland were awarded a penalty kick in the 76th minute after a foul by Tony Adams on Gordon Durie, but Gary McAllister's kick was saved by the England goalkeeper David Seaman. Shortly afterwards, Paul Gascoigne, who played in Scotland for the Glasgow club Rangers, scored a second goal for England, after chipping the ball over Scottish defender Colin Hendry. In 2006, the year before he became Prime Minister, Gordon Brown drew criticism in Scotland when he was reported as saying that Gascoigne's goal was one of his favourite moments in football, although Brown subsequently denied saying this.

Scotland eventually went out of the championship on goals scored, but would have proceeded beyond the first round of a tournament for the first time in their history had England not conceded a late goal in their 4–1 victory over the Netherlands in their final group game. The Guardian newspaper later commented that "England fans' joy was complete when Patrick Kluivert stole a late goal for the Dutch team – and thereby deprived Scotland of a place in the quarter-finals".

2000 European Championship play-off
The Euro 96 game had encouraged some to call for the resumption of regular matches between the two, but this did not happen. The teams did not meet again until three years later, in 1999, when they were again drawn together in the European Championship; this time in a qualifying play-off for the 2000 tournament, after both teams had finished as runners-up in their respective qualifying groups.

The tie took place over two legs, the first in Scotland at Hampden Park on Saturday 13 November 1999, with the return leg at Wembley four days later. The first leg was the first match contested by the two sides in Scotland for ten years. England won that match 2–0, with both goals scored by Paul Scholes. There was crowd trouble following the game, and 51 people were arrested in the city centre of Glasgow after battles between fans. Scotland had the better of the second match, winning 1–0 with a goal from Don Hutchison and coming close to a second goal, but England progressed to the finals of the tournament, winning 2–1 on aggregate.

August 2013 and November 2014 friendlies
In the early 21st century there were suggestions that the British Home Championship should be restored to the schedule, or at least for the England v Scotland fixture to be played more regularly. There was some speculation that England would invite Scotland to be their first opponents when Wembley Stadium was re-opened in 2007, but this did not happen. There was further talk of organising a one-off England v Scotland match at the end of the 2007–08 season, but the Scotland manager George Burley was opposed to this timing and the match was not arranged. On 16 June 2012, The Football Association announced that England would play Scotland in August 2013 as part of their 150th anniversary celebrations. England won an entertaining friendly fixture by 3–2, after Scotland had twice taken the lead.

It was announced in July 2014 that a return match would be played at Celtic Park on 18 November 2014, as an option for a return match had been included in the contract for the August 2013 friendly. Wayne Rooney scored twice in a 3–1 victory for England.

2018 World Cup qualification
The two teams were drawn together for 2018 FIFA World Cup qualification, in UEFA Group F.

2020 European Championship 
The teams met on 18 June 2021 at Wembley in Group D of the UEFA Euro 2020 finals, which had been delayed by the COVID-19 pandemic.

September 2023 friendly
In November 2022, a friendly game was announced for 12 September 2023 to commemorate the 150th anniversary of the first official international fixture between Scotland and England, to take place at Hampden Park.

Records

England and Scotland have played each other more than any other nation, playing 115 official matches. England have the better record overall in the fixture, with 48 wins to Scotland's 41. There have been 26 draws, only four of them goalless, with 98 years separating the first and second of those matches. England have scored 195 goals to 171 by Scotland. The record margin of victory in the fixture was England's 9–3 win in 1961, while Scotland's biggest victory was 7–2 in 1878. The record attendance of 149,415, which is also a European record attendance, was set at Hampden Park in 1937.

Scotland long held an advantage in terms of wins, as they recorded ten wins in the first 16 matches. Scotland, the far smaller country in terms of population, were superior during this period because passing football developed earlier there, as shown by the Scotch Professors who moved to play in the nascent English professional league during the late 1880s (although those players themselves were not eligible, as Scotland refused to pick England-based Scots until 1896). Scotland were also dominant in the 1920s and 30s, and prior to the Second World War had 29 wins in the series to England's 19. England reversed the dominance after the war: Scotland have only won 12 matches since then. The Scots did win three games out of four from 1974 to 1977, but lost every other meeting in the 1970s, and have only won three times (compared to 13 English wins) since 1977. England pulled ahead for the first time in the history of the fixture with their win in 1983.

All official matches between England and Scotland
Scores and results list Scotland's goal tally first

Club level

As well as the rivalry between the national sides, English and Scottish club teams have also met on numerous occasions in the various European club competitions. These matches are frequently described by the media as being a "Battle of Britain", irrespective of the clubs involved. Matches between English and Scottish club sides in the late 19th century were big events, such as the meeting in 1895 of English league champions Sunderland and Scottish league champions Hearts in a game grandly described as the Championship of the World. The most important club meeting was when Celtic and Leeds United met in the semi-final of the 1969–70 European Cup, which was the first contest to be popularly described as a "Battle of Britain". Celtic won the first leg at Elland Road 1–0, and the second leg was played at Hampden Park to allow a bigger crowd to attend than could be held at Celtic Park. Billy Bremner opened the scoring early on to level the aggregate score, but Celtic came back to win the match 2–1 and the tie 3–1.

Rangers defeated Leeds United home and away to qualify for the first Champions League group stage in 1992–93. Celtic lost on the away goals rule to Liverpool in the 1997–98 UEFA Cup, but they beat Blackburn Rovers and Liverpool on their run to the 2003 UEFA Cup Final. Celtic and Manchester United were drawn together twice in the Champions League group phase in quick succession, in 2006–07 and 2008–09, while Arsenal beat Celtic 5–1 on aggregate in the 2009–10 qualifiers.

Until 2007, the Scottish clubs held their own in meetings with English clubs, winning 13 and losing 12 of the 37 matches. Since 2007, the English clubs have been unbeaten in these fixtures. After a goalless draw between Manchester United and Rangers in the 2010–11 Champions League, The Daily Telegraph reporter Roddy Forsyth commented that the growing financial disparity between the two leagues was reflected in a below capacity attendance at Old Trafford, the defensive tactics used by Rangers, and the weakened team selection by United. Hearts suffered a record defeat against Tottenham in the 2011–12 UEFA Europa League, but performed more creditably against Liverpool in 2012–13. The most recent competitive meeting of clubs from the two countries was between Liverpool and Rangers in the 2022–23 UEFA Champions League.

There have also been a number of other competitions between English and Scottish clubs. Before European competition started in 1955, the Coronation Cup was staged in 1953, to mark the coronation of Queen Elizabeth II. Four prominent clubs from each country participated in a knockout tournament, with Celtic and Hibernian defeating two English clubs each to reach the final, which Celtic won 2–0 at Hampden. A similar competition called the Empire Exhibition Trophy was staged in 1938, with Celtic defeating Everton 1–0 in the final at Ibrox. Back in 1902, the four-team British League Cup was staged, with both Rangers and Celtic defeating their English opponents to set up a final between them (this was before the Old Firm term came into use).

In the 1970s, American oil giant Texaco sponsored the Texaco Cup, which was a knockout competition for clubs that had failed to qualify for the main European competitions. Interest in the competition soon waned, however, and Texaco withdrew their sponsorship after the 1974–75 season. The competition continued for a few years in the form of the Anglo-Scottish Cup, but it was discontinued in 1981.

Players and managers

The rivalry between the two nations has not prevented their respective nationals from playing in each other's domestic leagues, in certain cases to high renown. Historically, the trend has been for Scottish players to play in the richer English league, although many English players have also played in Scotland.

Many great English sides have been built around Scottish players. The double winning Spurs team of 1961 included Bill Brown, Dave Mackay and John White. Denis Law is the second greatest goalscorer in the history of Manchester United. The great Liverpool teams of the 1970s and 1980s were built around Kenny Dalglish, Graeme Souness and Alan Hansen, while Nottingham Forest's double European Cup-winning side included Archie Gemmill, John McGovern, John Robertson, and FWA Footballer of the Year Kenny Burns. The great Leeds United side of the 1960s and 1970s included several great Scottish players such as Billy Bremner, Peter Lorimer and Eddie Gray. Manchester United and Liverpool became the most successful clubs in English football, largely due to the efforts of Scottish managers Matt Busby and Bill Shankly, respectively.

In recent times, the flow of Scottish players to major English clubs has dried up, as the Scotland team has been less competitive at international level and the English Premier League has attracted stars from all over the world, rather than just from the British Isles. In contrast to this dearth of players, Scottish manager Alex Ferguson dominated the Premier League with Manchester United until his retirement in 2013. Ferguson claimed in 2010 that he had turned down approaches by the FA to manage England, partly because it would have been a "tremendous handicap" for any Scot to manage England. English managers have also worked at Scottish clubs, with John Barnes and Tony Mowbray managing Celtic for short periods.

There have been fewer notable English players who have played in Scotland. Joe Baker was the first player to play for England without having played in the Football League, but his was an isolated example because he played at a time when a player was only allowed to play for the country of his birth. Those rules have subsequently been relaxed and the sons or even grandsons of Scots are now allowed to play for Scotland. This means that some footballers born in England have played in and for Scotland, including Andy Goram and Stuart McCall.

There was an influx of English players to the Scottish league during the late 1980s after English clubs were banned from European competition due to the Heysel disaster. Prominent England players including Terry Butcher, Trevor Steven, Gary Stevens, Chris Woods and Mark Hateley all moved to Rangers. During this time, Rangers had a higher turnover than Manchester United and could therefore offer wages that could compare with even the biggest English clubs. Since the inception of the Premier League, however, the English clubs have become wealthier than Rangers and Celtic. No prominent England player has played in Scotland in recent years, although Chris Sutton and Alan Thompson played a significant part in Celtic's run to the 2003 UEFA Cup Final. The most recent player to be capped by England while playing in Scotland was Celtic goalkeeper Fraser Forster.

Supporters 
The rivalry also manifests itself in the fact that many Scottish people support England's opponents and vice versa, despite the fact that England and Scotland are both countries of the United Kingdom. Whether Scots should support England against other national teams is routinely a matter of heated debate. Some Scotland fans sing, "Stand up if you hate England" and, "If you hate the fucking English, clap your hands", while some English fans reciprocate these sentiments with, "Stand up if you hate Scotland", or "Scotland get battered everywhere they go". However, the phenomenon of Scots wishing England well in international tournaments is not unknown, with a survey on the eve of the 2002 World Cup finding that one Scot in three intended to support England, while only one in six intended to support England's opponents. A survey before the 2010 World Cup found a more even divide, with 24% on each side. The largest group in both surveys did not offer an opinion either way.

See also
Argentina–England football rivalry
Calcutta Cup in rugby
England–Germany football rivalry
List of sports rivalries in the United Kingdom
Scotland players born in England

Notes

References

External links
Opponents, England Stats
National Team Archive, Scottish Football Association (Archived)

 

 
International association football rivalries
Scotland
Scotland national football team
Football
England at UEFA Euro 1996
Scotland at UEFA Euro 1996
England at UEFA Euro 2020
Scotland at UEFA Euro 2020